The Great Liakhvi ( Didi Liakhvi, Styr Lewakhi) is a river in central Georgia, which rises on the southern slopes of the Greater Caucasus Mountain Range in the de facto independent region of South Ossetia and flows into the Kura (Mtkvari). The cities of Tskhinvali and Gori lie along the banks of the Great Liakhvi. The river is mainly fed by the melting snows and glacier runoff of the Caucasus Mountains as well as by underground water sources. The Liakhvi reaches its highest water volume in the spring and summer while the lowest volume is recorded in the winter, when some segments of the river freeze over.

The Little Liakhvi is a tributary.

References

Rivers of Georgia (country)
Rivers of South Ossetia
Tributaries of the Kura (Caspian Sea)